The 2009–10 season was Chelsea Football Club's 96th competitive season, 18th consecutive season in the Premier League, 104th year in existence as a football club and their first season coached by Carlo Ancelotti. Despite disappointment in the Champions League going out to eventual winners Inter Milan in the round of 16, the club had the most successful season in its history, winning the Premier League for a third time and retaining the FA Cup for the first time, thus becoming the seventh English club to complete the "Double".

The season is also notable for the attacking football that was displayed, which resulted in the team breaking several Premier League records and statistics including most goals scored in a season (103), most goals scored at home in a season (68) and best goal difference in a season (+71). Chelsea became the first top-flight team to reach a century of league goals since Tottenham Hotspur in 1962/63. The team only failed to score in two of 53 games, a club record. As of 2022, the team holds the Premier League record for most goals scored at home in a season.

Kits
Supplier: Adidas / Sponsor: Samsung

Season summary
Chelsea won the FA Cup and the English Premier League to complete the Double for the first time in their history, while breaking numerous Premier League records in the number of goals they managed.

Key dates
 01.06.09: Carlo Ancelotti is appointed as the new Chelsea manager following the departure of temporary first team coach Guus Hiddink, with his tenure set to commence on 1 July.
 02.07.09: Goalkeeper Ross Turnbull signs a four-year deal on a free transfer from Middlesbrough, along with news that Henrique Hilário has renewed his contract for two more years.
 03.07.09: Chelsea finalize a four-year deal for striker Daniel Sturridge after his contract with Manchester City expires.
 07.07.09: Winger Yuri Zhirkov signs for Chelsea from CSKA Moscow on a four-year deal for a reported £18 million.
 27.07.09: Chelsea wins the inaugural World Football Challenge tournament, beating Internazionale, Milan, and América.
 28.07.09: Former Chelsea chairman Brian Mears passes away at the age of 78.
 04.08.09: Striker Franco Di Santo joins Blackburn Rovers on loan until 1 January.
 06.08.09: Winger Scott Sinclair joins Wigan Athletic on a season-long loan deal.
 09.08.45: With their first penalty shootout win in over a decade, Chelsea secure the 2009 Community Shield following a 2–2 draw against Manchester United in normal time. After United's Nani opens the scoring, goals by Ricardo Carvalho and Frank Lampard look to win the game for Chelsea until an injury-time equalizer by Wayne Rooney forces the game to penalties. Chelsea win the shootout 4–1.
 13.08.09: Michael Mancienne signs a new four-year deal, keeping him at Chelsea until 2013, then signs on loan with Wolverhampton Wanderers until the end of the season.
 15.08.09: Chelsea's Premier League campaign kicks off with a difficult 2–1 home victory over a defensively resolute Hull City side. After ex-Reading player Stephen Hunt scores against the run of play, a Didier Drogba free-kick makes things even. Although Chelsea dominate the second half of the game, Hull's tenacity and a lack of quality finishing make it look like the game will end a damaging draw for Chelsea, until Drogba's chipped cross in stoppage time loops over the head of Hull keeper Boaz Myhill and serendipitously falls into the corner of the net.
 18.08.09: Chelsea sign young Serbian central midfielder Nemanja Matić from MFK Košice for a fee of £1.5 million.
 27.08.09: Chelsea are grouped with Porto, Atlético Madrid and APOEL in the UEFA Champions League group stage draw at the Grimaldi Forum in Monaco. During the ceremony, John Terry is awarded the UEFA Club Defender of the Year award.
 29.08.09: Chelsea claim first place in the Premier League for the first time this season with a 3–0 home win over Burnley. In a game characterised by Chelsea's dominance, after Nicolas Anelka breaks the deadlock from close range before half-time, a quick-fire double at the start of the second half via a Michael Ballack header and an Ashley Cole volley secures a comfortable victory. During the match, Chelsea are paired with fellow Londoners Queens Park Rangers in the League Cup third round draw.
 03.09.09: For inducing reserve player Gaël Kakuta into breaching his contract with his previous club Lens, FIFA ban Chelsea from signing any new players nationally or internationally until January 2011, and demand the club to pay Lens £113,500 training compensation. Kakuta is fined £680,000 and banned from playing officially for four months.
 15.09.09: After a hard-fought 2–1 win away against Stoke City in the Premier League, a lone Nicolas Anelka goal kicks off Chelsea's Champions League campaign with a tight 1–0 win in Group D over Porto. With mainstays Didier Drogba and José Bosingwa suspended for their protests in last year's semi-final, along with the difficulty caused by constant rainfall on the pitch, the Chelsea performance is unusually sloppy, but a solid performance by goalkeeper Petr Čech guides the team to victory. Atlético Madrid draw 0–0 at home with APOEL, leaving Chelsea two points clear at the top of the group after one game played.
 20.09.09: With a 3–0 win at home against London rivals Tottenham Hotspur with goals from Ashley Cole, Michael Ballack and Didier Drogba, Chelsea set a new club record of 11 consecutive Premier League victories, surpassing the record of ten games set during the 2005–06 season.
 23.09.09: Chelsea kick off their League Cup challenge with a low-key 1–0 home victory over Queens Park Rangers in the third round. Salomon Kalou notches the only goal, set up by Joe Cole in his first game since January. Yuri Zhirkov, Sam Hutchinson and Fabio Borini all make their first starts for the club.
 26.09.09: Although Didier Drogba scores his 100th Chelsea goal against Wigan Athletic to briefly equalise, Chelsea look strangely uninspired in a 1–3 loss at the DW Stadium, having gone down to ten men after Petr Čech's sending off six minutes after half time following a penalty-worthy challenge on Hugo Rodallega. Chelsea relinquish their Premier League lead to Manchester United, falling into second place on goals scored.
 04.10.09: In their first "Big Four" clash of the season, Chelsea edge a typically tight game at Stamford Bridge with a 2–0 Premier League victory over title rivals Liverpool. Didier Drogba sets up both Chelsea goals from wide positions, first from the left for Nicolas Anelka, and then from the right for Florent Malouda to seal the win in stoppage time. Henrique Hilário proves a solid deputy for the suspended Petr Čech, as the goalkeeper produces excellent saves from Albert Riera and Steven Gerrard to keep the clean sheet, assisted by a horrendous miss from Yossi Benayoun towards the end of the game. Manchester United's fortuitous 2–2 draw with Sunderland at Old Trafford the day before means Chelsea return to the top of the league.
 17.10.09: Chelsea are beaten by Aston Villa 2–1 away at Villa Park. Following Didier Drogba's early strike, James Collins and Richard Dunne score the goals which inflict Chelsea's second successive away defeat under Carlo Ancelotti.
 24.10.09: Chelsea thrash Blackburn Rovers 5–0 at Stamford Bridge in their most emphatic Premier League victory so far this season, only a few days after humbling Atlético Madrid in the Champions League by one goal less. Joe Cole enjoys a sparkling performance at the top of the midfield diamond in his first league start since January, with a Gaël Givet own goal opening the scoring. A 30-yard Michael Essien drive sandwiches two goals by Frank Lampard, and Didier Drogba completes the rout with a simple header from a corner. The next day, Liverpool break their four-game losing streak with a 2–0 victory over Manchester United at Anfield. After losing their lead again the previous week, this result leaves Chelsea two points clear.
 4.11.09: Chelsea qualify for the Champions League knockout round after sharing the points in a 2–2 draw with Atlético Madrid at the Vicente Calderón Stadium that burst into life into the last ten minutes. After Sergio Agüero volleyed home midway through the second half, a quickfire double in the last ten minutes by the in-form Didier Drogba gives Chelsea a perhaps undeserved 2–1 lead, canceled out by an Agüero free-kick.
 8.11.09: Chelsea beat Manchester United 1–0 at Stamford Bridge in the Premier League in a typically tight contest, decided by John Terry's header from an inswinging Frank Lampard free-kick after Darren Fletcher was controversially judged to have bundled over Ashley Cole on the left-hand side. Despite arguably controlling the game with their 4–3–3 formation, a late rally by United could not salvage them a point against a resolute Chelsea defence. Chelsea increase their lead at the top of the league by five points while Arsenal leapfrog United into second place with a game in hand.
 22.11.09: Despite having key players like Frank Lampard, Michael Ballack and Didier Drogba missing through injury, Chelsea romp to a comfortable 4–0 victory at home to Wolves in the Premier League with goals from Florent Malouda, Joe Cole and two from a rampant Michael Essien. While Nemanja Matić makes his Chelsea debut from the bench, Gaël Kakuta also makes a flair-filled first appearance for the club.
 29.11.09: Chelsea continue their 100% record in "Big Four" matches this season with an emphatic 3–0 away win against Arsenal at the Emirates Stadium in the Premier League. Two goals from Didier Drogba and an own goal from Thomas Vermaelen secure the victory, agreed by many to be the pinnacle of Chelsea's season thus far.
 16.12.09: Chelsea end their run of four straight games without a win in all competitions, which began with their penalty shootout elimination by Blackburn away in the League Cup fifth round, with a closely fought 2–1 victory over Portsmouth, led by former Chelsea manager Avram Grant, at Stamford Bridge in the Premier League. After Nicolas Anelka scores from close-range in the first half, Portsmouth equalize early in the second when a Jamie O'Hara free kick ricochets off two players in the Chelsea wall, falling to Frédéric Piquionne who slots home. This typifies Chelsea's recent problem of conceding from set-pieces. The game is won ten minutes from time when Frank Lampard converts the penalty kick conceded when Marc Wilson takes out Branislav Ivanović in the Portsmouth area.
 04.01.10: Having ended December with two away draws against West Ham United and Birmingham and a tense 2–1 home victory against Fulham in the west London derby, Chelsea begin the New Year in style with a 5–0 home demolition of Watford in the FA Cup third round, despite losing their African players to the African Cup of Nations. While Daniel Sturridge scores his first two goals for the club, Chelsea also score via a Florent Malouda deflection, a John Eustace own goal and a trademark Frank Lampard piledriver.
 28.01.10: Chelsea end January on a high after winning all five matches in the month, demolishing Sunderland 7–2 at Stamford Bridge in the Premier League. Following that, they continue to score with a 3–0 win at home over Birmingham before a laboured 2–1 win away at Burnley, with John Terry scoring a late header to win the game amidst his affair scandal. They also progress in the FA Cup thanks to a 2–0 win away at Preston North End.
 02.02.10: Despite an excellent January, February does not start well with Chelsea succumbing to a 1–1 draw at Hull City. Didier Drogba equalises for Chelsea late in the first-half with a free-kick after Hull's Steven Mouyokolo gave the home side the lead with a header from a corner. Chelsea go two points clear of Manchester United but missed a chance to go four points clear after failing to win their game in hand.
 04.02.10: FIFA's suspended transfer ban on Chelsea regarding the Gaël Kakuta tapping-up case is lifted by the Court of Arbitration for Sport, along with all other sanctions.
 27.02.10: Chelsea lose at home for the first time in the Premier League under Carlo Ancelotti as Manchester City win 4–2. The game is given extra spice as it is the first time that John Terry and Wayne Bridge have come together following allegations of Terry's affair with Bridge's girlfriend Vanessa Perroncel, which leads to him rejecting Terry's outstretched hand in the pre-match handshake. Frank Lampard opens and closes the scoring, but braces from Carlos Tevez and Craig Bellamy in between are enough to secure a Manchester City victory.
 16.03.10: Chelsea are eliminated from the Champions League before the semi-finals for the first time in four years as a 3–1 aggregate loss to Internazionale in the first knockout round sees them crash out of the tournament. A 2–1 defeat at the San Siro on 24.02.10 is compounded by a 1–0 loss at home in the second leg, with Samuel Eto'o scoring the only goal. The match marks Mourinho's first return to Stamford Bridge as an opposition manager since his departure from Chelsea in September 2007.
 21.03.10: Chelsea complete a disappointing week with a draw to Blackburn at Ewood Park in the Premier League. After Didier Drogba opens the scoring early on, the game looks to yield a comfortable victory for Chelsea, but a game-ending injury to Branislav Ivanovic proves costly as El Hadji Diouf equalises with twenty minutes to play, beating substitute right back Paulo Ferreira to a header at the far post. The result sees them slip to third place, four points behind Manchester United with a game in hand.
 27.03.10: After bouncing straight back with a 5–0 victory against Portsmouth at Fratton Park in midweek, Chelsea complete their recovery from the previous week by recording their biggest win of the season with a 7–1 thrashing of Aston Villa at Stamford Bridge. In a game that sees John Terry captain the side for a record 325th time, Frank Lampard scores four times for the second time in his Chelsea career, moving him into third place in the list of Chelsea's all-time highest scorers with 151 goals, above both Peter Osgood and Roy Bentley. Florent Malouda also nets a brace and Salomon Kalou scores his first Premier League goal of the season.
 03.04.10: Chelsea gain a crucial victory in the Premier League title race by defeating top-of-the-table Manchester United 2–1 at Old Trafford, returning to first place by two points with five games to play. The victory ensures that Chelsea maintain their 100% record in "Big Four" matches this season. After Joe Cole caps off a comfortable Chelsea first half with a clever near-post back-heel from Florent Malouda's cross to open the scoring, United begin to gain a foothold in the game in the second half. Didier Drogba comes off the bench to score the winning goal late on from an offside position, but Federico Macheda's disputedly handball goal for United minutes later sets up a nervy finish. In a game marked by a poor performance by referee Mike Dean, ignoring plausible penalty shouts by both sides, Chelsea hold on for three emphatic points.
 10.04.10: Chelsea defeat Aston Villa at Wembley in the FA Cup semi-final to book a place in their third FA Cup Final in four years. After referee Howard Webb turns down a strong penalty appeal from Gabriel Agbonlahor in the first half following a trip from Mikel John Obi, Didier Drogba, Florent Malouda and Frank Lampard score in the second half to secure a 3–0 victory.
 17.04.10: A 2–1 loss to Tottenham sees Chelsea's lead in the Premier League cut to one point, with Manchester United securing a late winner against Manchester City. Despite losing, Chelsea become the first English team to qualify for the 2010–11 UEFA Champions League.
 24.04.10: Chelsea defeat Stoke City 7–0 at Stamford Bridge to record their biggest home win of the season thus far. Salomon Kalou scores his first hat-trick in English football, and a brace from Frank Lampard, coupled with goals from Florent Malouda and Daniel Sturridge, ensure the Blues cruise comfortable.
 02.05.10: Chelsea defeat Liverpool 2–0 at Anfield in the penultimate week of the season. Didier Drogba opens the scoring following a sloppy backpass from Steven Gerrard in the first half, and Frank Lampard doubles the lead after the interval. The win ensures that Chelsea end their season with a 100% record against "Big Four" opponents, and means that victory over Wigan on the final day of the season will guarantee Premier League success.
 06.05.10: Chelsea's Player of the Year Award goes to Didier Drogba, who claims the gong for the first time in his Chelsea career. Florent Malouda picks up the Samsung Players' Player Award, while the Young Player of the Year is awarded to the entire Chelsea U18 team after their triumph in the FA Cup Youth Final. Ashley Cole's goal against Sunderland earns him the Goal of the Season Award.
 09.05.10: Chelsea trounce Wigan 8–0 in their final game of the season, setting a new club record for their biggest ever League win in the process as well as breaking numerous scoring records. They end the league campaign having scored 103 goals, the most in the club's history, the first Premier League side to score 100 goals in a season and the first team since Tottenham in 1961 to score 100 goals in the top flight. They also become the first team in English football history to score seven goals or more in a game on four occasions in a league season. They also finish with an English record goal difference of +71, beating Liverpool's +69 set in 1979. Didier Drogba's second half hat-trick ensures he finishes the season with the Premier League Golden Boot, having scored 29 goals, three more than the 26 scored by second-placed Wayne Rooney. Nicolas Anelka bags a brace while Frank Lampard, Salomon Kalou and Ashley Cole grab the other goals. Most significantly, the win means that Chelsea finish the season as Premier League champions with a total of 86 points, one point more than Manchester United, who finish runners-up.
 15.05.10: In their final game of the season, Chelsea face relegated Portsmouth in an entertaining 2010 FA Cup Final at Wembley Stadium. Despite their stark difference in position in the end-of-season table and extended Chelsea pressure, with Chelsea hitting the woodwork five times in the first half, the two sides go in level at half-time. Soon after Portsmouth's Kevin-Prince Boateng's penalty is saved by Petr Čech early in the second half, Chelsea finally make their pressure count when Didier Drogba fires in a 59th minute free-kick, his 37th goal of the season. Although Frank Lampard uncharacteristically squanders a penalty of his own late on, Chelsea remain superior, the game eventually ending 1–0. Chelsea consequently end their season as only the seventh club to complete the Double, making it the most successful season in Chelsea history.

Squad

First team squad

Reserve squad

Youth squad

UEFA Champions League squad

Club

Coaching staff

Notes:
 * = Player is no longer with the club but still made an appearance during the season.

Top scorers
Includes all competitive matches. The list is sorted by shirt number when total goals are equal.

Disciplinary record
Includes all competitive matches. Players with 1 card or more included only.

Overall
{|class="wikitable"
|-
|Games played || 55 (38 Premier League, 8 UEFA Champions League, 3 Football League Cup, 6 FA Cup)
|-
|Games won || 39 (27 Premier League, 4 UEFA Champions League, 2 Football League Cup, 6 FA Cup)
|-
|Games drawn ||  7 (5 Premier League, 2 UEFA Champions League)
|-
|Games lost || 9 (6 Premier League, 2 UEFA Champions League, 1 Football League Cup)
|-
|Goals scored || 142
|-
|Goals conceded || 44
|-
|Goal difference || +98
|-
|Clean sheets || 29
|-
|Yellow cards || 82
|-
|Red cards || 6
|-
|Worst discipline ||  John Terry (11 , 1 )
|-
|Best result(s) || 8–0 (H) v Wigan Athletic – Premier League – 9 May 2010
|-
|rowspan="2"|Worst result(s) || 2–4 (H) v Manchester City – Premier League – 27 February 2010
|-
|3–1 (A) v Wigan Athletic – Premier League – 23 September 2009
|-
|Most appearances || John Terry with 51 appearances
|-
|Top scorer ||  Didier Drogba (37 goals)
|-
|Points || 124/165 (75.15%)
|-

Honours

Individuals

Player

Manager

See also
 Chelsea F.C.

References

External links
 Chelsea FC official website
 Chelsea FC on Soccerbase
 UEFA Champions League

2009-10
2009–10 Premier League by team
2009-10